Ruby Svarc (born 28 September 1993) is an Australian rules footballer who plays for Brisbane in the AFL Women's (AFLW).

Svarc is from Corowa, New South Wales and grew up on a farm with older sister Cathy Svarc in a family passionate about Australian rules. 

She spent the 2021 season on the Lions' list without making her debut and was announced as a delisting at the end of the season. She was, however, shortly afterwards reinstated to the Lions' list for the 2022 season, and made her AFLW debut in round 3 that year in the Lions' win against  at Carrara Stadium.

She won the inaugural AFL Women's Grand Final sprint in 2021.

References

External links

1993 births
Living people
Sportswomen from Victoria (Australia)
Australian rules footballers from Victoria (Australia)
Brisbane Lions (AFLW) players